The Making of Mr. Spoons is the sixth album, and the fifth studio album, by Ezio, released in 2003.The track "My friend tonight" contains the hidden track "The further we stretch" after more than 17 minutes of silence (making the total running time 28:01).

Track listing

All songs written by Ezio Lunedei.

"Inside me again (Immigrants table)" – 3:55
"Waiting for too long" – 5:54
"Everybody forgets sometimes" – 3:57
"Mr. Spoons" – 4:34
"Song 4 the tempted"  - 3:22
"Take me away" – 4:56
"The same mistake" – 4:21
"Mermaid song" – 4:32
"Shadowboxers" – 4:54
"Sometimes I wish" – 5:23
"My friend tonight (darkness)" – 6:18
"The further we stretch" – 4:05

See also
2003 in music

2003 albums
Ezio (band) albums